Jim Aitken (born 22 November 1947) is a British businessman and former Scotland international rugby union player. His regular playing position was Prop.

Rugby Union career

Amateur career

Aitken played for his hometown club Penicuik, before moving to First Division Gala. He was the Gala Captain for their 3 League Championships in 1979/80, 80/81 and 82/83.

Provincial career

Aitken was capped by South of Scotland.

Aitken played for Scotland Probables in the Trial match against Scotland Possibles on 11 January 1975.

International career

Aitken was capped twice by Scotland 'B' - in 1975 and 1976 against France 'B' - before receiving a full senior cap.

Aitken won 24 international caps and scored one try, playing at loose head prop, between 1977 and 1984, and captained the Scottish Grand Slam side in the 1984 Five Nations Championship.

Aitken won his first cap for Scotland at the age of 29 against England in 1977, but was then replaced by the legendary two-time Lion, Ian McLauchlan, because of concerns about his scrummaging. After working hard on his technique, he returned in 1981 and played 21 of the next 24 tests. He captained Scotland to victory against England at Twickenham in 1983, Scotland's first win there since 1971. He played in Scotland's 25–25 draw against New Zealand, still the closest that Scotland have ever come to beating the All Blacks.

The next season, Scotland won the Grand Slam under his guidance, and he scored a crucial try against Wales to set up a winner-takes-all match versus France, which Scotland won 21–12. It was Scotland's first Grand Slam since 1925. He played one more game for Scotland against Romania before retiring with a Scotland captaincy record of played 7, won 5, drew 1, lost 1. A magnificent achievement to be remembered as one of Scotland's most successful ever skippers. In recent years he has been critical of the state of Scottish rugby, describing it as "a mess", particularly former Scotland coaching duo, Ian McGeechan and Jim Telfer.

Business career

Aitken underachieved at High School but graduated from Edinburgh College of Commerce. He is now a successful businessman, owning one of Scotland's largest grain merchants and having sold his previous company, Scotmalt, in 2003. In 2009, he donated £100,000 to the Conservative Party, becoming the second-largest donor to the Scottish branch of the party.

References

1947 births
Living people
Gala RFC players
Penicuik RFC players
Rugby union players from Penicuik
Scotland 'B' international rugby union players
Scotland international rugby union players
Scotland Probables players
Scottish Conservative Party
Scottish rugby union players
South of Scotland District (rugby union) players
Rugby union props